Privolny is a rural locality (a settlement) in Svetloyarsky District, Volgograd Oblast, Russia. The population was 1,608 as of 2010. There are 18 streets.

Geography 
Privolny is located 75 km southwest of Svetly Yar (the district's administrative centre) by road. Abganerovo is the nearest rural locality.

References 

Rural localities in Svetloyarsky District